Tsunga is a village in Honde Valley, Manicaland province in Zimbabwe.

Populated places in Manicaland Province